Horní Jiřetín is a town in Most District in the Ústí nad Labem Region of the Czech Republic. It has about 2,200 inhabitants.

Administrative parts
Horní Jiřetín consists of Černice, Dolní Jiřetín, Horní Jiřetín, Jezeří and Mariánské Údolí.

Geography

It lies on the border between the Most Basin and Ore Mountains. The Loupnice Stream flows though the town. There are several ponds and artificial lakes in the municipal territory.

History
The first written mention of Horní Jiřetín is from 1263 under the name Jorenthal. In 1409, Jiřetín was divided into Horní ("Upper") and Dolní ("Lower") Jiřetín. During the 17th century, Horní Jiřetín was affected by the Thirty Years' War and by the great plague epidemic in 1680. From the 17th century, Horní Jiřetín, divided by the Jiřetínský stream, was mainly governed by the Lobkowicz and Waldstein families.

Until the end of the World War II, the village was part of the German-speaking Sudetenland. In 1945, most of the population was expelled and replaced by Czechs.

Demographics

Economy

In the past, the inhabitants of Jiřetín subsisted mainly on fishing in Lake Komořany, ore mining and various forms of agriculture, mainly arboriculture. Lignite has been continuously mined in Horní Jiřetín since the middle of the 19th century. Today, a significant part of the municipal territory is occupied by a lignite surface mine, Lom ČSA. In 2015, the Ministry of Industry proposed breaking the mining limits imposed on the mine. This would lead to the demolition of 170 houses in Horní Jiřetín. However, the proposal specifically for this mine was not accepted.

In 1828, a cotton plant was built in Mariánské Údolí. It is still in operation today as the Triola company and it manufactures underwear and swimwear.

Sights

The most important architectural monument is the Jezeří Castle incorporated into the slopes of the Ore Mountains. It was originally a Gothic castle from the 14th century, later rebuilt in the Renaissance and then in the Baroque style. Most of its English-style park was destroyed by coal mining. Since 2023, it has been protected as a national cultural monument.

In Horní Jiřetín is the valuable Church of the Assumption of the Virgin Mary. It was built in the early Baroque style in 1694–1700 according to design of the architect Jean Baptiste Mathey.

Notable people
Franz Joseph Glæser (1798–1861), Czech-Danish composer
Vladimír Sommer (1921–1997), composer
Walter Womacka (1925–2010), German artist
Vladimír Buřt (born 1964), ecologist, mayor of the town

Twin towns – sister cities

Horní Jiřetín is twinned with:
 Battenberg, Germany

References

External links

Cities and towns in the Czech Republic
Populated places in Most District
Towns in the Ore Mountains